Profile is the thirteenth album by Irish folk and rebel band The Wolfe Tones.

Track list 
 My Heart is in Ireland
 Wearing of the Green
 Mullingar Feadh
 Plastic Bullets
 Macushla Mavourneen
 Song of Liberty
 Women of Ireland
 Butcher's Apron
 Little Jimmy Murphy
 The Sailor St. Brendan
 Toor a Loo Tooralay
 Far Away in Australia

The Wolfe Tones albums
1985 albums